Turn It On is the debut studio album by Indonesian blues rock band Gugun and the Bluesbug, which later changed to Gugun Blues Shelter and then the band also known as Gugun Power Trio.

Track listing
 Twenty Dollars
 Move On
 Take It Slow
 Talk Too Much
 On The Run
 Plastic People
 Orangantagram
 Ask Your Soul
 Night Flying
 Trouble Town
 Last Orders

Personnel 
 Gugun - Lead Guitar and Lead Vocals
 Jono Armstrong - Bass guitar
 Iskandar -Drums

References

External links 
 Official Site

2004 albums
Gugun Blues Shelter albums